En Vivo Desde Chicago (Eng.: Live From Chicago) is the title of a live album released by duranguense ensemble Grupo Montéz de Durango. This album became their first number-one set on the Billboard Top Latin Albums.

Track listing
The information from Billboard and Allmusic.

CD

DVD

Multimedia

Chart performance

Sales and certifications

References

Grupo Montez de Durango live albums
2004 live albums
2004 video albums
Live video albums
Disa Records live albums